"Au soleil" (English: Under the Sun) is Jenifer Bartoli's second and the most successful single of her career, from her first album Jenifer on which it is the second track on this album. It was released on July 2002 in francophone countries and achieved a great success in France and Belgium (Wallonia), and was also a Top 20 hit in Spain.

Song information
This optimistic song was written by Hocine Hallaf and produced by Nicolas Neidhardt & Benjamin Raffaëlli.

There is also a version in Spanish-language under the title "Junto al sol". This song was covered by Hong Kong Cantopop singer Janice Vidal in 2007 as "Doesn't Matter (無所謂)".

In the video, Jenifer walks on the beach. Suddenly, when she begins to sing the refrain, the clouds disappear and the sun starts to shine. This video was shot in February on the beach of Sainte-Croix, near Marseille, France.

In France, the single debuted at number ten on 13 July 2002 and reached a peak at number two for three weeks, but was unable to dislodge the two successive number-one hits Brastisla Boys' "Stach Stach" and MC Solaar's "Inch'Allah". The single remained for 12 weeks in the top ten, 21 weeks in the top 50 and 24 weeks in the top 100. The single was eventually awarded Gold certification by SNEP.

The single charted for 17 weeks on Belgian Ultratop 40 Singles Chart, from 20 July 2002. It entered at number 24, jumped to number seven, and eventually reached number four on 14 September.

"Au soleil" appeared for eight weeks on the Swiss Singles Chart, peaking at number 63 in its sixth week on 12 January 2003.

Track listings
 CD single  - France (Island, limited edition)
 "Au soleil" (single version) — 3:18
 "Secrets défenses" (Christophe Deschamps/Jeanne Ermilova) — 3:49
 "Au soleil" (video)

 CD maxi - Spain (Mercury)
 "Au soleil" — 3:38
 "Au soleil" (Audio Agenda club dub mix) — 7:33
 "Junto al sol" (Hocine Hallaf/adapt. Marcia Romano) — 3:40
 "Là où tu rêves" (Benjamin Raffaëlli/Marie-Jo Zarb) — 4:02

 Digital download
 "Au soleil" — 3:18
 "Au soleil" (2005 live version) — 4:06

Credits

Personnel
"Au soleil"
Benjamin Raffaëlli: guitar
Nicolas Neidhardt: keyboards & programming
Laurent Vernerey: bass guitar
Christophe Deschamps: drums & percussion
Guillaume Eyango: backing vocals
Murielle Lefebvre: backing vocals
Jean-François Berger: string arrangement & conducting

"Secrets défenses"
Pierre Jaconelli: guitar
Vincent Perrot: keyboards & programming
Christophe Voisin: keyboards & programming
Laurent Vernerey: bass guitar
Christophe Deschamps: drums

"Là où tu rêves"
Benjamin Raffaëlli: guitar, keyboards & programming
Laurent Vernerey: bass guitar
Christophe Deschamps: drums & percussion
Denis Benarrosh: percussion
Guillaume Eyango: backing vocals
Murielle Lefebvre: backing vocals
Laurent Marimbert: string arrangement & conducting

Production
"Au soleil" produced by Nicolas Neidhardt & Benjamin Raffaëlli
"Secrets défenses" produced by Christophe Deschamps & Vincent Perrot
"Là où rêves" produced by Benjamin Raffaëlli

Design
Michel Sedan: photography
Happydesign: cover design

Charts and sales

Weekly charts

Year-end charts

Certifications

Remake
In 2017, Jenifer made a remake of the song with the French singing formation Kids United. The new version appeared on the Kids United 2017 album Forever United. The song charted for one week on the French Singles Chart at number 146.

Peek position

References

External links
 "Au soleil", lyrics
 "Au soleil", music video

2002 singles
Jenifer (singer) songs